The Alapahoochee River is a  tributary of the Alapaha River in Georgia and Florida in the United States.  Via the Alapaha and Suwannee rivers, its waters flow to the Gulf of Mexico.

Other names: Little River, Little Alapaha and Grand Bay Creek.

Crossings

See also
List of rivers of Florida
List of rivers of Georgia

References

External links

USGS Hydrologic Unit Map - State of Georgia (1974)

Rivers of Florida
Rivers of Georgia (U.S. state)
Rivers of Lowndes County, Georgia
Rivers of Echols County, Georgia
Bodies of water of Hamilton County, Florida